Elodina angulipennis (common pearl white) is a butterfly in the family Pieridae. It is found along the north-eastern coast of Australia.

The wingspan is about 40 mm. The upperside of the wings is pearly white, with black marks around the tips of the forewings. The underside of the forewings is pearly pale yellow with a grey patch near the apex, while the underside of the hindwings is white with an arc of grey spots.

The larvae feed on various Capparaceae species, including Capparis arborea and
Capparis canescens. They are green with reddish-brown marks and a pale yellow dorsal line. Full-grown larvae reach a length of about 20 mm. Pupation takes place in a green pupa.

References

Butterflies described in 1852
angulipennis